The William W. Early House is a Queen Anne-style house located at Brandywine in Prince George's County, Maryland, United States, and is privately owned. It was constructed in 1907. According to a 1989 Historic American Buildings Survey report on the house, "The William W. Early House is probably the best example of turn-of-the-century Queen Anne-style domestic architecture in the county."

History
William W. Early had the house built on the property of his childhood home which included 23 acres of land. He was the grandson of William H. Early, an important landowner and developer of the village of Brandywine. William W. Early was the general manager for the Southern Maryland Railroad; this house contained his business office. The family resided in the house until 1949.

There were minor changes to the house in 1940 and 1970 for modernization.

The William W. Early House was listed on the National Register of Historic Places in 1988.

Architecture
This Queen Anne style house is roughly square, with a hip-roofed -story main block, and asymmetrical gable-roofed extensions, projecting bays, and corner tower, all decorated with fine jigsawn and shingle detail. A two-story octagonal tower forms one corner of the house.

Present
The current house with 3,221 square feet of living space is on 3.27 acres. There was an extensive restoration in 2002. It has been featured on the Home and Garden Network's Old Homes Restored.

References

External links
, including photo in 1985, at Maryland Historical Trust website

Description of House: several current photos and a list of features of the William W. Early House
The Early Family: History and photographs of the Early family of Brandywine, Maryland

Houses completed in 1907
Houses in Prince George's County, Maryland
Queen Anne architecture in Maryland
Houses on the National Register of Historic Places in Maryland
Historic American Buildings Survey in Maryland
Historic district contributing properties in Maryland
Individually listed contributing properties to historic districts on the National Register in Maryland
National Register of Historic Places in Prince George's County, Maryland